Pınar Selek (born October 8, 1971) is a Turkish sociologist, feminist, and author. She is known for her work on the rights of vulnerable communities in Turkey, including women, the poor, street children, sexual minorities, and Kurdish communities. She is the author of several books published in Turkish, German, and French, and is one of the founding editors of Amargi, a Turkish feminist journal. She currently resides in France and became a French citizen in 2017.

Selek has been prosecuted over a 15-year period in Turkey in connection to an explosion that occurred at the Spice Bazaar, Istanbul in 1998. Tried and acquitted of all charges on three occasions (in 2006, 2008, and 2011), her most recent acquittal was amended in November 2012 by the Istanbul Heavy Penal Court No. 12, which sentenced her to life in prison on January 24, 2013. Selek's lawyers have appealed the verdict and announced plans to bring her case before the European Court of Human Rights.

Education

Selek attended the high school Lycée Notre Dame de Sion Istanbul and completed her undergraduate and graduate studies in the sociology department at Mimar Sinan Fine Arts University. In 2014 she obtained a doctorate in political science from the University of Strasbourg.

Arrest, imprisonment, and release, 1998–2000

Pınar Selek was arrested on July 11, 1998, in connection to an explosion that had occurred two days prior at the Spice Bazaar, Istanbul, which had killed seven people and wounded approximately 100 others. The arrest is widely considered to have been motivated by her contact with Kurds as part of her academic research. Her work was confiscated, and she refused to name the individuals she had interviewed during the course of her research. Another suspect, Abdülmecit Öztürk, was arrested two weeks after Selek, and confessed to police that the two had carried out the bombing together, although he later recanted his statement and claimed that he had been tortured in police custody. Öztürk was later acquitted of all charges, and his statement against Selek was ruled as inadmissible.

After spending two and a half years in prison, during which time she was subject to torture and ill-treatment, Selek was released on December 22, 2000, when a team of experts, including faculty from Istanbul University's Analytic Chemistry Department and Cerrahpaşa Medical Faculty's Forensic Department, issued reports concluding that the explosion had been caused by the accidental ignition of a gas cylinder. Three expert witnesses assigned by the court also testified that the explosion was caused by a gas leak.

Acquittals, retrial, and sentencing, 2006–present

The Istanbul High Criminal Court No. 12 acquitted Selek of wrongdoing on three occasions (in 2006, 2008, and 2011), citing a lack of any evidence linking her to the blast. Nonetheless, the court decided on November 22, 2012, to amend its own prior acquittal decisions and reopen her trial, a move which her defense lawyers labeled as "unprecedented in Turkish legal history."

On January 24, 2013, after just over an hour of deliberation, the court sentenced her to life in prison for the 1998 spice bazaar bombing. The decision was reached by majority of two to one, with the head judge in the case issuing a dissenting opinion. While Selek was tried in absentia, more than 30 nongovernmental organizations and political party representatives from France, Germany, Italy, and Austria attended the hearings, and nearly 150 people protested during the trial. Four observers from the University of Strasbourg, including the vice rector, also attended the trial.

Support from academic institutions and international organizations

The International Federation for Human Rights (FIDH) and World Organisation Against Torture (OMCT) have called on Turkish authorities to end the 14-year "judicial harassment" of Selek, calling her actions a "legitimate exercise of the freedom of opinion and expression." PEN International has expressed outrage and concern and argued that the judicial campaign against Selek seeks to penalize her for her "long standing support for and work on minority groups in Turkey." The Middle East Studies Association of North America (MESA) has expressed its support for Selek and dismay at the prolonged denial of justice she has been subject to. In a letter addressed to Turkish Prime Minister Recep Tayyip Erdoğan, MESA's Committee on Academic Freedom asserted that: "all of the circumstances attendant to her case suggest that Selek has been on trial for the last fourteen years for her research on the PKK in violation of her right to academic freedom." Human Rights Watch has called her prosecution a "perversion of the criminal justice system and abuse of due process," and insisted that the "baseless charges should be dropped once and for all." Turkish journalist Cengiz Çandar called the January 2013 ruling a "travesty" and a "disgraceful judgment."

Other organizations that have voiced solidarity with Selek include Amnesty International, the Transnational Work Group on Academic Liberty and Freedom of Research in Turkey, the French Sociological Association and the Committee of Concerned Scientists.

Alain Beretz, president of the University of Strasbourg, has espoused the university's solidarity with Selek, calling her life imprisonment conviction "unjust and revolting." At a press conference following the verdict, Selek vowed to continue her struggle for justice.

Publications 
In 1996 she translated Ya Basta into Turkish. It is a collection of letters from the leader of the Zapatistas Subcomandante Marcos.  In 2001 Maskeler Süvariler Gacılar was published which focused on the lives of the trans community. She has also written two children's books.

See also 
Academic freedom
Human rights in Turkey
List of prosecuted Turkish writers
Legal system of the Republic of Turkey

References

External links 

 Pinar Selek website (in Turkish)
"I Can Feel a Huge Amount of Solidarity" Interview with Pinar Selek.

1971 births
Living people
Academics from Istanbul
Turkish women academics
Turkish dissidents
Turkish sociologists
Turkish women sociologists
Turkish democracy activists
Turkish human rights activists
Turkish LGBT rights activists
Turkish women's rights activists
Turkish children's writers
Writers from Istanbul
Turkish expatriates in France
University of Strasbourg alumni
Trials in Turkey
Turkish women children's writers
Lycée Notre Dame de Sion Istanbul alumni
French people of Turkish descent
20th-century Turkish women writers
21st-century Turkish women writers
20th-century Turkish writers
21st-century Turkish writers